Sylvania High School (abbreviated as SHS) is a high school situated in the Sutherland Shire, in the Southeast region of Sydney, New South Wales. 793 students.

History 
Construction finished in January 1970, with the school opening that same year.

References 

Sutherland Shire
Public high schools in Sydney